This is the list of cathedrals in Bangladesh sorted by denomination.

Roman Catholic

Cathedrals of the Roman Catholic Church in Bangladesh:
 St Peter's Cathedral in Barisal
 Our Lady of the Holy Rosary Cathedral, Chittagong
 St. Mary's Cathedral in Dhaka
 St. Francis Xavier Cathedral in Dinajpur
 St. Joseph's Cathedral in Khulna
 St. Patrick's Cathedral in Mymensingh
 Cathedral of Christ the Redeemer in Rajshahi
 Church of the Divine Mercy in Moulvibazar, pro-cathedral of Sylhet

Anglican

Cathedrals of the Church of Bangladesh:
 St John's Cathedral in Kushtia
 St Thomas’ Church in Dhaka

See also
 List of cathedrals
 Christianity in Bangladesh

References

Cathedrals in Bangladesh
Bangladesh
Cathedrals
Cathedrals